Gurak-e Kalleh Bandi (also Romanized as Gūrak-e Kalleh Bandī; also known as Gūrak-e Kelebandī) is a village in Delvar Rural District, Delvar District, Tangestan County, Bushehr Province, Iran. At the 2006 census, its population was 670, in 167 families.

References 

Populated places in Tangestan County